Kanehira is both a masculine Japanese given name and a surname. Notable people with the name include:

, Japanese botanist
Imai Kanehira (1152–1184), Japanese military commander
, Japanese kugyō
, Japanese voice actor

Japanese-language surnames
Japanese masculine given names